Drypetes oblongifolia is a plant species of the genus Drypetes and the family Putranjivaceae.

It is found in the shola forest of Kerala, a state in India.

It is a host for larvae of the butterfly species Appias albina and Appias india.

References

External links
http://www.biotik.org/india/species/d/drypoblo/drypoblo_en.html
Photo of Drypetes oblongifolia (Bedd.) Airy Shaw - EUPHORBIACEAE

oblongifolia